John Henckel was Chief Justice of Jamaica in 1801.

References 

Chief justices of Jamaica
Year of birth missing
Year of death missing
19th-century Jamaican judges